The splittail  (Pogonichthys macrolepidotus), also called Sacramento splittail, is a cyprinid fish native to the low-elevation waters of the Central Valley in California. It was first described by William O. Ayres in 1854. It is the sole living member of its genus, the Clear Lake splittail P. ciscoides having become extinct in the 1970s.

The distinctive feature of the splittail is the larger upper lobe of the tail fin. It also has tiny barbels at the corners of the mouth. The dorsal fin has 9-10 rays, while the pectoral fins have 16-19 rays, the pelvic fin 8-9 rays, and the anal fin 7-9 rays. Color is silver on the sides, with a dusky olive gray on the back; during the breeding season the fins pick up a red-orange tinge, and the males become darker and develop white tubercles on the head and at the bases of the fins.

They feed on bottom-dwelling invertebrates and detritus, generally in areas of low to moderate current. In Suisun Bay, opossum shrimp (mostly Neomysis mercedis), amphipods such as Corophium, and copepods are favorite foods, while in the Sacramento Delta they eat clams, crustaceans, and insect larvae. During periods of high water levels (February/March), splittails will move into flooded areas to look for earthworms. The Sacramento splittail utilizes floodplain habitat for feeding and spawning, and depends upon floodplain habitat for spawning..

Range
Their range is the lower-elevation waters of the Central Valley, extending to San Francisco Bay. Although once found as far north as Redding, they are now only rarely seen in the upper Sacramento River. They were once caught from southern San Francisco Bay and in Coyote Creek (Santa Clara County), but are now restricted to the Sacramento Delta, Suisun Bay, and the lower parts of Sonoma Creek, Petaluma River and Napa River. They are tolerant of moderate levels of salinity and/or alkalinity.

Status
Splittail were reclassified as a species of special concern by the U.S. Fish and Wildlife Service on September 22, 2003 from their prior classification as threatened due to litigation. In 2010, the FWS found that the splittail did not warrant listing under the Endangered Species Act. The Central Valley's system of sloughs and backwaters maintained by annual flooding has greatly changed. The cause of the decline of this species is under investigation. IUCN previously classified the splittail as endangered, but the status was downgraded to least concern in 2013.

References

 Peter B. Moyle, Inland Fishes of California (University of California Press, 2002), pp. 146–150

Pogonichthys
Endemic fauna of California
Fish of the Western United States
Freshwater fish of the United States
Natural history of the Central Valley (California)
Fish described in 1854